Joseph Thomas Heistand (March 3, 1924 – October 14, 2008) was a WWII Veteran and later became the Bishop of the Episcopal Diocese of Arizona from 1979 to 1992.

Early life
Heistand was born on March 3, 1924, in Danville, Pennsylvania, the son of the Reverend John Thomas Heistand, who later became Bishop of Harrisburg, and Alta Hertzler. He studied at Trinity College in Hartford, Connecticut but in 1943 left and enlisted in the U.S. Army.

Military service
Heistand served in the 29th Field Artillery, Third infantry Division. He was awarded the Bronze Star for valorous conduct at the battle at Anzio during the Italian campaign. He was also awarded the Purple Heart, the Oak Leaf Cluster, and the Croix de Guerre for his combat in France.

Education
Upon his return, he finished studies at Trinity College and graduated with a bachelor's degree in economics. In 1948 he was briefly employed by the International Harvester Company but a year later he commenced studies at Virginia Theological Seminary from where he graduated in 1952.

Ordained ministry
Heistand was ordained deacon in June 1952 and as a priest on December 9, 1953, by his father in Trinity Church, Tyrone, Pennsylvania. His first post was as deacon-in-charge, and then rector, of Trinity Church in Tyrone, Pennsylvania. In 1955 he became senior assistant, and then rector, of St Paul's Church in Richmond, Virginia. Whilst at St Paul's, he was involved in the city's racial integration program and founded the Oral School for Deaf Children and the Adult Center for the Physically Handicapped. Between 1969 and 1976, he served as rector of St Philip's in-the-Hills Church in Tucson, Arizona.

Episcopacy
Heistand was elected Coadjutor Bishop of Arizona in 1976 and was consecrated on August 28, 1976, by Presiding Bishop John Allin, and co-consecrated by his father J. Thomas Heistand and Robert Bruce Hall, Bishop of Virginia. He succeeded as diocesan bishop in 1979. During his time as bishop in Arizona, Heistand presided over the first ordination of a woman in the diocese. He retired in 1992. He died on October 14, 2008, in Richmond, Virginia.

Family
Heistand married Roberta C. Lush in 1951 and together had three children.

References 

 Joseph T. Heistand, retired bishop of Arizona, dies at 84

1924 births
2008 deaths
20th-century American Episcopalians
Episcopal bishops of Arizona
People from Danville, Pennsylvania
United States Army personnel of World War II
Trinity College (Connecticut) alumni
Virginia Theological Seminary alumni
20th-century American clergy